ProAc Limited is a British loudspeaker manufacturing company. The company was reportedly founded by Stewart Tyler in 1979 and registered on 09/05/1988. The brand of ProAc was built on the reputation of his first loudspeaker manufacturing entity, Celef Audio Ltd., which was reportedly founded in 1973, incorporated on 10/09/1975 and renamed to Celef Audio International Limited on 10/12/1985. The Celef name is no longer used for marketing, but still appears to remain the legal and financial entity operating the ProAc brand.

Reviews
Tablette - "a speaker that isn't as neutral as the BBC LS3/5a compact monitor, but that does manage to equal or exceed that venerable design in most respects." - Stereophile, April 11, 1984.
Response 2 - "THOSE PROACS KICKED ASS!!!!" "some of the very best speakers I've heard at any price, but that's not why I love 'em so. No, the reason I adore these ProAcs is because—they're NOT audiophile speakers!" - Stereophile, July 10, 1992.
Response 1S "How sweet the sound" - Stereophile, September 1, 1994.
Studio 100 - "The use of a treble-challenged tube amp is mandatory to hear the Studio 100s at their best." - Stereophile, October 1, 1994.
Response 2.5 - ""Emotional" Speaker.. playing the "Resurrection" through the 2.5s brings a lump to your throat and a tear to your eye, he's succeeded." - Stereophile, January 10, 1996.
Response 3 - "Whew—these are killers—KILLERS—K-I-L-L-E-R-S!!!" "unequivocally faithful to the music. Go hear them now! If you even consider changing your speakers, I implore you to audition these imported masterpieces from the UK—a truly Class A product in every regard." - Stereophile, September 5, 1991.
Response 4 - "stunning, world-class performer in every regard. It is well deserving of a Class A recommendation and has become a cherished component of my reference system. I recommend that you do whatever it takes to hear this lovely loudspeaker. It deserves to be compared with any speaker at any price." - Stereophile, March 1, 1994.
Response 1SC - "Small wonders, a well-engineered gem of a speaker." - Stereophile, March 5, 1998.
Response 3.8 - "If a loudspeaker can pull me into the music—as the ProAc Response 3.8 did time and again—I know that it's doing a superb job." - Stereophile, January 10, 2000.
Future 1 - "Tactile, transparent, crystalline, and fast without being hard, bright, or analytical, the ProAc Future One fulfills Stuart Tyler's goal of building a loudspeaker with all the desired qualities of electrostatic designs and none of their drawbacks." "that ribbon tweeter had me hearing new stuff in every recording I played. And despite their relatively small size (they're definitely apartment-friendly), the Ones created a big, smooth, detailed, satisfying sound." - Stereophile, October 10, 2000.
Response 2 - "stunning product that delivers a quality of sound most audiophile speakers only hint at." - Stereophile, September 10, 2005.
Response D28 - "open and pleasing, and when you combine its strengths with its lack of any glaring weaknesses, you have another great two-way speaker from Stewart Tyler." - Stereophile, August 22, 2008.
Response D2 - "well-engineered loudspeaker from a designer with a long track record of producing good-sounding speakers." - Stereophile, June 21, 2010.
Response DT8 - "highly recommended" - What HiFi in 2018.
Response D2R - "let me forget the hardware—and life for that matter—and fall deeply into the music. Very highly recommended." -Stereophile, March 31, 2020.

External links
ProAc Website

References

Loudspeaker manufacturers
Companies based in Northamptonshire
Audio equipment manufacturers of the United Kingdom